Tim Clue (born 1962) is an American funny motivational speaker, comedian, director, and playwright, based in Chicago, Illinois. He is the founder of MindSlap Meetings.

As a professional comedian, Clue received his training at The Second City in Chicago. For a brief period, he hosted WGN Radio comedy show and New Year's Eve radio show with Steve Cochran.

Early life and education
Born in 1962, Clue grew up in Rochelle, Illinois. He completed his bachelor's degree in communications from Bradley University in 1985. At Bradley, he met with Marco Benassi and later, both became part of the university speech team. They participated in speech tournaments and in those tournaments performed adapted poetry or short story. As they excelled and became important part of speech team, they were awarded with full scholarship at the university. For a brief period, Clue coached the college speech teams and later taught speech at the College of DuPage.

In 2005, he graduated with a master's in speech communication and rhetoric from the Eastern Michigan University.

Career
Clue started his career by writing a stand-up comedy.

In 1992, he founded Short Story Theatre, a theater company which is focused on combing short fiction and documentary footage.

In 1994, Greek Stories was premiered. In the same year, he directed Bark Like a Comic along with A.J. Lentini, Bill Gorgo and Jimmy Rhodes. In the following year, he and Benassi worked on The Jewish Melody and Other Definitions of Confinement, adapted from the short stories written by Dmitry Stonov.

In 1997, he worked on a show called Greek Streets with Marco Benassi.

In 1999, he co-wrote and directed Tiny Pig with Spike Manton.

In 2004, he worked on the Leaving Iowa with Spike Manton. The comedy was produced by the Purple Rose Theatre Company.

Clue is co-founder of Chicago Sitcom, a production company that develops works for stage, film, and television. Previously, he has worked as the coach of the College of DuPage (COD) national championship speech team.

Work

Books
 Manton, Spike; Clue, Tim (2008). Leaving Iowa: The Comedy about Family Vacations

Plays
 Greek Stories (1994)
 Bark Like a Comic (1994)
 The Jewish Melody (1995)
 Other Definitions of Confinement (1995)
 ''Greek Streets (1997)
 Tiny Pig (1999)
 Leaving Iowa (2004)

References

Living people
Writers from Chicago
American male comedians
American dramatists and playwrights
Comedians from Illinois
Bradley University alumni
Eastern Michigan University alumni
1965 births